Brodie McAlister (born in New Zealand) is a New Zealand rugby union player who plays for the  in Super Rugby. His playing position is hooker. He was named in the Crusaders squad for week 15 in 2019.

Reference list

External links
 itsrugby.co.uk profile

New Zealand rugby union players
Living people
Rugby union hookers
1997 births
Canterbury rugby union players
Crusaders (rugby union) players